Avalon: The Greatest Hits (2009) is a greatest hits album by Contemporary Christian music vocal group Avalon.  Titles appearing on the album include fan-favorites "Give It Up", "Adonai", "Can't Live A Day", "All", and "You Were There", as well as "Testify To Love", the latter of which became the longest-running No. 1 Adult Contemporary song in the history of the CCM Update AC chart.  Also included is then-new recording and radio single, "Still My God".  The song garnered immediate attention and success, eventually becoming Avalon's 21st career #1 radio hit.  In addition, the song peaked at #2 on Radio & Records' Soft AC/Inspo chart.

Content 
Avalon: The Greatest Hits is the third greatest hits album released by Avalon alongside record label Sparrow Records, the first being 2003's offering Testify To Love: The Very Best Of Avalon.  Avalon: The Greatest Hits marked the end of the quartet's career with Sparrow, fulfilling a contract that spanned over a decade.  Despite this, the group soon after released a new, studio album on E1 Music, aptly titled Reborn, on September 15, 2009.

Track listing

References

Avalon (band) albums
2009 greatest hits albums